"The Bottle Deposit" is a two-part episode, the 131st and 132nd episodes, and 21st and 22nd episodes of the seventh season, of the NBC sitcom Seinfeld, first aired on May 2, 1996. It was originally an hour-long episode, but was split into two parts for syndication.

The episode was written by Gregg Kavet and Andy Robin, and directed by Andy Ackerman. In this episode, Newman and Kramer launch a scheme to redeem empty bottles and cans in Michigan for an extra five cents each, leading to a chase after a mechanic driving Jerry's stolen car, which contains a set of golf clubs formerly owned by John F. Kennedy. Meanwhile, George is assigned a big project but doesn't know what it is and is too ashamed to ask his supervisor for the details.

Plot

Part 1
Since he will be out of town, Mr. Peterman asks Elaine to bid for him at a Sotheby's auction on a set of golf clubs once owned by John F. Kennedy. Jerry takes Elaine to the auction, where they bump into Sue Ellen Mischke, Elaine's rival. The two snipe at each other, provoking a bidding war between them over the clubs. Elaine ends up paying $20,000, twice what she was authorized by Peterman to spend. Elaine leaves the clubs in Jerry's car.

Newman learns that bottles and cans can be refunded for 5 cents in New York but 10 cents in Michigan. Kramer tells him it is impossible to gain a profit from depositing bottles in Michigan due to the gas, tollbooth and truck rental fees. However, while crunching the numbers for himself, Newman recalls that there will be a surge of mail the week before Mother's Day to be sorted in Saginaw, Michigan. He signs up for a mail truck that will carry spillover mail from the four main trucks, leaving plenty of space for bottles and cans to refund in Michigan, and thereby avoiding truck rental fees. Newman and Kramer set off collecting and stealing cans and bottles.

Mr. Wilhelm scolds George for needing to have orders repeated to him. While talking of a big project for him to do, Wilhelm enters the bathroom. George waits outside, but then finds that Wilhelm had been explaining the details of the project in the bathroom, thinking George was there. Afraid to ask Wilhelm to repeat orders again, he instead asks him the best way to get started, and is directed to payroll. However, the payroll clerk knows nothing about the project. He calls Wilhelm to verify, but when George asks him what the project is, he thinks George is berating him for not immediately believing him.

Wilhelm asks if George has gone downtown for the project yet, and mentions "the song". Thinking he means the Petula Clark song "Downtown", George and Jerry try to decipher the lyrics, but to no avail.

Jerry's car breaks down because Kramer and Newman, who had borrowed the car, left their groceries in the engine compartment. He takes it to Tony, a mechanic obsessed with car care. After examining the car, Tony guilt trips Jerry over his lackadaisical care for it, in particular getting substandard oil changes at Jiffy Lube outlets and not knowing the mileage, and demands he change his ways. Weary of Tony's moralistic harangues, Jerry asks to have his car back so he can take his business elsewhere. Tony says he will bring the car out front, but drives away with it instead.

Part 2
Due to forgetting to take his medication, Mr. Wilhelm completes George's project himself. After finding it complete, he congratulates George on his accomplishment. George is puzzled but opts not to question his lucky break. However, when Steinbrenner sees the project he recognizes that the author is certifiably insane, and has George put in a mental institution.

While driving the mail truck to Saginaw, Kramer spots Jerry's stolen car on an Ohio highway and alerts Jerry by mobile phone. At Jerry and Elaine's urging, Kramer diverts from the road to Saginaw in order to pursue Jerry's stolen car (with JFK golf clubs still inside) as it exits the highway. Struggling to keep up, Kramer dumps their bottles, cans, mail bags, and ultimately, Newman himself to make the truck move faster. Newman finds his way to a farmer's house, and is offered hospitality. As Kramer continues his chase, Tony throws all of the JFK golf clubs and the golf bag itself at him, putting the mail truck out of commission. Kramer collects the discarded clubs and meets up with Newman at the farm house, just before they are both chased away due to Newman having a sexual liaison with the farmer's daughter. Elaine gives the golf clubs, several of which were bent during the hot pursuit, to Mr. Peterman. He assumes their battered state is due to Kennedy venting his frustration on the golf course.

Production
Like most two-part Seinfeld episodes, "The Bottle Deposit" was originally conceived as a normal half-hour time slot episode, ran considerably over the allotted 23 minutes during filming, and was filled out to an hour long time slot with additional scenes after the producers concluded that editing it down to 23 minutes would be too difficult. Scenes which were added for the second round of filming include the "Downtown" thread, Jerry's talk with the detective, the identification of the wrecked car, Kramer and Newman singing a parody of "99 Bottles of Beer", Newman's dinner with the farmer and his daughter, and the scene in the insane asylum.

The farmer's daughter's cry of "Goodbye, Norman! Goodbye!" at the end of the episode was not as scripted. Actress Karen Lynn Scott misremembered Newman's name, but the Seinfeld team decided the goof made the scene funnier, so it was kept in. Newman's first name was never revealed during the series. During filming of the scene, the running made actor Wayne Knight, then at his peak weight, experience palpitations. Consulting a doctor afterwards, he was told that it was imperative that he lose weight, which led to Knight developing a trimmer figure.

See also
Container deposit legislation

References

External links
 
 Michigan man guilty in "Seinfeld"-esque can return scheme, CBS News

1996 American television episodes
Television episodes set in Michigan
Seinfeld (season 7) episodes
Seinfeld episodes in multiple parts
Container deposit legislation